Manoj Nandwana is a film distributor and Film Producer of Bollywood. with more than 14 years of experience in the movie business. Manoj Nandwana also famous for his controversial film project based on Neera Wadia.

Background

Born  in Rajasthan, Manoj Nandwana is a commerce graduate and holds degree of Chartered Accountancy. He later on founded Jai Viratra Entertainment Limited on 14 November 1996 and has been distributing movies across India since then. Initially, JVEL started to distribute big budgeted films in the territory of Rajasthan. Karan Arjun, Bombay, Zamana Diwanaa and Kudrat are some of the movies distributed under the JVEL banner.

Film Production

In the year 2002, Manoj Nandwana's JVEL ventured into film production in association with M/s Raj Films and produced Karampath starring Sunil Shetty in the lead. After which, 'Do Chehare’ followed featuring Suniel Shetty, Krishna Abhishek, Shatrughan Sinha, Farha, Shakti Kapoor, Kiran Kumar, Mohnish Behl, Negar Khan, and Sohail Khan. In the year 2007, their music album ‘Poo Kya Jalwa Hai’ was released. JVEL also owns the worldwide distribution rights for ‘Banegi Apni Baat’ starring Raghuveer Yadav.

Paresh Rawal and Om Puri starrer Road to Sangam was jointly produced by JVEL and Gemini Studios which had released in 2009. Critically acclaimed 2010 release Udaan was co-produced. by JVEL in association with UTV Motion Pictures and Sanjay Singh.

Filmography

References

External links
 Manoj Nandwana on Bollywood HUngama
 Manoj Nanwana on IMDB

Film producers from Mumbai
Living people

Year of birth missing (living people)